Rapotín is a municipality and village in Šumperk District in the Olomouc Region of the Czech Republic. It has about 3,300 inhabitants.

Geography
It lies in the Hanušovice Highlands. The municipality is situated on the right bank of the Desná River.

History
The first written mention of Rapotín is from 1391. The village was founded by German colonizers in the 13th century. The most notable owners of the village were the Zierotin family. From 1802, it was owned by the House of Liechtenstein.

In the second half of the 17th century, the area around the Desná River was where Northern Moravia witch trials took place. There were also 7 women from Rapotín among the victims of the inquisition. The burning of the women is commemorated by a memorial from 1678.

Rapotín was damaged during the 1997 Central European flood.

Sights
The landmark of Rapotín is the Church of the Assumption of the Virgin Mary. It is a neo-Gothic church built in 1874, which replaced an old wooden building from the 16th century. The church is equipped by a pipe organ made by the Rieger Orgelbau company.

Twin towns – sister cities

Rapotín is twinned with:
 Opatovce nad Nitrou, Slovakia
 Paszowice, Poland

References

External links

Villages in Šumperk District